Cavada is a surname. Notable people with the surname include:

Adolfo Fernández Cavada (1832–1871), Cuban-born American Civil War veteran and diplomat
Carlos Oviedo Cavada (1927–1998), Chilean Roman Catholic cardinal 
Federico Fernández Cavada (1831–1871), American Civil War veteran and diplomat
José Alfonso Cavada (1832–1909), Chilean politician

See also
Cavadas (surname)